Pirongia Forest Park is a protected area 30 km southwest of Hamilton, New Zealand. The park encompasses Mount Pirongia west of Pirongia and Mount Karioi near the coast southwest of Raglan. Wairēinga / Bridal Veil Falls Scenic Reserve is also in the area, but is separate to Pirongia Forest Park.

Flora and fauna
The park's climate is mild and wet, with humid summers and temperate winters. The area around Mount Pirongia receives over 2,400 mm of rain per year. Most of the park is covered in podocarp forest of rimu, totara, kahikatea and tawa with a dense understorey rich in tree ferns. Pirongia Forest Park lies at the natural southern limit of kauri forest. Towards the south of the forest park, the forest increasingly contains beech. 

The forest is inhabited by many native bird species such as kererū, tui, bellbirds, fantails, morepork, and silvereyes, as well as rarer birds such as grey warblers, tomtits, and the occasional kaka.

Recreation
The park contains several short walks as well as longer bush tramps leading to the summits of both mountains. Popular walks are the Nikau Track, also suitable for cycling, and a walking track to the Kaniwhaniwha Caves, two small limestone caves.  A longer track, following the Bell Track, leads to the tallest kahikatea tree. This 66.5 m tall tree is the tallest recorded native tree in New Zealand. The Bell Track continues to the Mount Pirongia summit, which is also accessible via other tracks.

Recreational hunting is encouraged, as it controls introduced wild animal populations such as goats. Brown trout can be found in the Kaniwhaniwha Stream. Permits/licenses are required for both activities.

Accommodation options are three free campsites, a lodge, and a hut near the summit of Mount Pirongia.

See also
Forest parks of New Zealand
Protected areas of New Zealand

References

Forest parks of New Zealand
Protected areas of Waikato
Waipa District